Zemo-Koshka is a settlement in the Java district de jure and Dzau District de facto  of South Ossetia, a region of Georgia whose sovereignty is disputed.

See also
 Dzau district
Provisional Administration of South Ossetia

Notes

References 

Populated places in Dzau District